The women's 50 metre butterfly S6 event at the 2012 Paralympic Games took place on 7 September, at the London Aquatics Centre.

Two heats were held, one with seven swimmers and the other with eight. The swimmers with the eight fastest times advanced to the final.

Heats

Heat 1

Heat 2

Final

References

Swimming at the 2012 Summer Paralympics
2012 in women's swimming